Sammy Frost was a footballer who played as a half back for Manchester City between 1901 and 1906.

Frost made his Manchester City debut in September 1901 in a 3–1 defeat against Everton. He was part of the City team which defeated Bolton Wanderers 1–0 to win the 1904 FA Cup Final.

He made 103 league appearances for Manchester City and scored 4 goals. He subsequently played for Millwall before recurring knee ailments forced him to retire.

Honours
Manchester City
FA Cup (1): 1904

References

English footballers
Manchester City F.C. players
Millwall F.C. players
English Football League players
Association football defenders
FA Cup Final players